Drasko Bogdanovic (or Draško Bogdanović, (Serbian Cyrillic: Драшко Богдановић, born in 1977) is a Canadian artist of Serb origin. He was born in Sarajevo, Bosnia and Herzegovina, Yugoslavia. Bogdanovic is especially interested in portrait photography and homoeroticism. A classically trained musician and self-taught painter, he took up digital photography after emigrating to Canada in 1996.

An early fascination with Hollywood magazines and black & white photography influenced Bogdanovic to juxtapose classical posture with natural light in his male nude photography. Today his landscape and architecture photography capture cities’ geometry, immutable personalities and intrinsic emotions. His photography has appeared in domestic newspapers and magazines and has been featured in local and national advertising campaigns. Introspectre, one of Bogdanović's most prominent works, was given the Award of Merit at The Ontario Society of Artists' Annual Exhibition in May 2008.

Drasko Bogdanović is a regular columnist at Xtra!, Toronto's gay scene magazine.

References

External links
 Drasko Bogdanovic's official website

1977 births
Living people
Bosnia and Herzegovina refugees
Canadian photographers
Canadian erotic photographers
Canadian LGBT artists
Bosnia and Herzegovina LGBT people
Naturalized citizens of Canada
Artists from Sarajevo
Serbs of Bosnia and Herzegovina
Bosnia and Herzegovina emigrants to Canada
LGBT photographers
21st-century Canadian LGBT people